The Mirchi Music Award for Lyricist of The Year is given yearly by Radio Mirchi as a part of its annual Mirchi Music Awards for Hindi films, to recognise a lyricist who has delivered an outstanding performance in a film song.

Superlatives

List of winners
 2008 Javed Akhtar - "Jashn-e-Bahara from Jodha Akbar
 Prasoon Joshi - "Behka" from Ghajini
 Prasoon Joshi - "Guzarish" from 'Ghajini
 Anvita Dutt Guptan - "Khuda Jaane" from Bachna Ae Haseeno
 Prasoon Joshi - "Kaise Mujhe" from Ghajini
 2009 Prasoon Joshi - "Masakali" from Delhi-6
 2010 Gulzar - "Dil To Bachcha Hai" from Ishqiya
 Niranjan Iyengar - "Sajdaa" from My Name is Khan
 Faaiz Anwaar - "Tere Mast Mast Do Nain" from Dabangg
 Niranjan Iyengar - "Tere Naina" from My Name is Khan
 Gulzar - "Surili Akhiyon Wale" from Veer
 2011 Javed Akhtar - "Khwabon Ke Parindey" from Zindagi Na Milegi Dobara
 Rajat Aroraa - "Ishq Sufiyana" from The Dirty Picture
 Irshad Kamil - "Nadaan Parinde"	from Rockstar
 Javed Akhtar - "Senorita" from Zindagi Na Milegi Dobara
 Shabbir Ahmed & Neelesh Misra -"Teri Meri" from Bodyguard
 2012 Javed Akhtar - "Jee Le Zara" from Talaash
 Amitabh Bhattacharya - "Abhi Mujh Mein Kahin" from Agneepath
 Neelesh Misra - "Kyon" from Barfi!
 Sameer Anjaan - "Dagabaaz Re" Dabangg 2
 Gulzar - "Saans"	from Jab Tak Hai Jaan
 2013 Prasoon Joshi - "Maston Ka Jhund" from Bhaag Milkha Bhaag
 Mithoon - "Tum Hi Ho" from Aashiqui 2
 Prasoon Joshi - "Zinda" from Bhaag Milkha Bhaag
 Amitabh Bhattacharya - "Sawar Loon" from Lootera
 Amitabh Bhattacharya - "Kabira" from Yeh Jawaani Hai Deewani
 2014 Irshad Kamil - "Manwa Laage" from Happy New Year
 Kausar Munir - "Suno Na Sangemarmar" from Youngistaan
 Gulzar - "Bismil" from Haider
 Manoj Muntashir - "Galliyan" from Ek Villain
 Rashmi Singh - "Muskurane" from CityLights
 2015 Varun Grover - "Moh Moh Ke Dhaage" from Dum Laga Ke Haisha
 Irshad Kamil - "Agar Tum Saath Ho" - Tamasha
 Javed Akhtar - "Phir Bhi Yeh Zindagi" from Dil Dhadakne Do
 Siddharth-Garima, Nasir Faraaz & Ganesh Chandanshive - "Dewaani Mastani" from Bajirao Mastani
 Mayur Puri - "Chunar" from ABCD 2
 2016 Amitabh Bhattacharya - "Channa Mereya" from Ae Dil Hai Mushkil
 Amitabh Bhattacharya - "Ae Dil Hai Mushkil" from Ae Dil Hai Mushkil
 Amitabh Bhattacharya - "Bulleya" from Ae Dil Hai Mushkil
 Amitabh Bhattacharya - "Haanikaraak Bapu" from Dangal
 Irshad Kamil - "Jag Ghoomeya" from Sultan
 2017 Irshad Kamil - "Hawayein"  from Jab Harry Met Sejal
 Anvita Dutt - "Sahiba" from Phillauri
 Kumaar - "Pyar Ho" from Munna Michael
 Kausar Munir - "Maana Ke Hum Yaar Nahin" from Meri Pyaari Bindu
 Irshad Kamil - "Safar" from Jab Harry Met Sejal
 Arafat Mehmood & Tanishk Bagchi - "Baarish" from Half Girlfriend
 2018 Gulzar - "Ae Watan (Male)"  from Raazi
 Kumaar - "Tera Yaar Hoon Main" from Sonu Ke Titu Ki Sweety
 A. M. Turaz - "Ek Dil Ek Jaan" from Padmaavat
 Gulzar - "Dilbaro" from Raazi
 Irshad Kamil - "Aahista" from Laila Majnu
 2019 Amitabh Bhattacharya - "Kalank" from Kalank
 Irshad Kamil - "Bekhayali" from Kabir Singh
 Manoj Muntashir - "Teri Mitti" from Kesari
 Prasoon Joshi - "Bharat" from Manikarnika: The Queen of Jhansi
 Raj Shekhar - "Beh Chala" from Uri: The Surgical Strike

See also
 Mirchi Music Awards
 Bollywood
 Cinema of India

References

Mirchi Music Awards